Daouda Karamoko Bamba (born 5 March 1995) is an Ivorian professional footballer who plays as a striker for Bulgarian First League club CSKA Sofia.

Career statistics

Club

References

1995 births
Living people
People from Dabou
Ivorian footballers
Kongsvinger IL Toppfotball players
Kristiansund BK players
SK Brann players
Altay S.K. footballers
PFC CSKA Sofia players
Ivorian expatriate footballers
Expatriate footballers in Norway
Ivorian expatriate sportspeople in Norway
Expatriate footballers in Turkey
Ivorian expatriate sportspeople in Turkey
Expatriate footballers in Bulgaria
Ivorian expatriate sportspeople in Bulgaria
Norwegian First Division players
Eliteserien players
Süper Lig players
First Professional Football League (Bulgaria) players
Association football forwards